Ditte Larsen (born 24 April 1983) is a Danish football midfielder. She currently plays for Brøndby IF (women) and the Danish national team.  From 2005 to 2007 she played in Norway for Asker FK.

References
Profile at club site
Danish Football Union (DBU) statistics

1983 births
Living people
Danish women's footballers
Denmark women's international footballers
Asker Fotball (women) players
Danish expatriate women's footballers
Expatriate women's footballers in Norway
Danish expatriate sportspeople in Norway
Toppserien players
Brøndby IF (women) players
Women's association football midfielders